Easy Millions is a 1933 American comedy film directed by Fred C. Newmeyer and starring Richard 'Skeets' Gallagher, Dorothy Burgess and Merna Kennedy.

Cast
 Richard 'Skeets' Gallagher		
 Dorothy Burgess	
 Merna Kennedy		
 Johnny Arthur	
 Noah Beery	
 Bert Roach	
 Gay Seabrook	
 Pauline Garon		
 Ethel Wales	
 Arthur Hoyt
 Walter Long	
 Henry Roquemore	
 Ted Adams
 Virginia Sale	
 Leroy Boles	
 Murdock MacQuarrie

References

Bibliography
 Pitts, Michael R. Poverty Row Studios, 1929-1940. McFarland & Company, 2005.

External links
 

1933 films
1933 comedy films
1930s English-language films
American comedy films
Films directed by Fred C. Newmeyer
1930s American films